The Universidad Católica San Antonio ("Saint Anthony Catholic University"), also known as the Universidad Católica de Murcia (UCAM), is a private university located in Murcia in south-eastern Spain.  Founded in 1996 by José Luis Mendoza Pérez, a lay Catholic, with the permission of Bishop Javier Azagra Labiano of the Roman Catholic Diocese of Cartagena, UCAM offers undergraduate and graduate academic programs taught by faculty and researchers engaged with the quality of the education provided. The university is characterized by a firm commitment to Catholic orthodoxy and the moral and social doctrines of the Church. UCAM aims to contribute to the transmission of human knowledge and the development of research, from the critical, responsible and creative freedom of the person, according to gospel principles. UCAM developed a system of quality management applied to teaching, research and services to ensure the human relations among all members of the university community in order to make more effective educational work and research.

History 
In 1978 Pope John Paul II promulgated the Apostolic Constitution Ex Corde Ecclesiae, which made allowance, in Article 3.3, for the establishment of Catholic universities by laypersons. Prior to Ex Corde Ecclesiae, only clergy and religious, along with affiliated institutions such as regional episcopal conferences and religious societies, were authorized under canon law to found institutes of higher learning under the patronage of the Roman Catholic Church. The document reflects the directives of the Second Vatican Council, which called for increased lay participation in the Church's liturgical and administrative life.

UCAM, the brainchild of founder and president José Luis Mendoza Pérez, was the first such university to be established under the new conditions presented in Article 3.3. A member of the Pontifical Council for the Family and father of 14 children, Mendoza serves as president of the university. At its establishment in 1996, UCAM had a population of approximately 600 students.   its population had expanded to over 16,000.

Campus 

UCAM is located in Guadalupe just outside the city of Murcia (capital of the eponymous region of Murcia). At the heart of the campus is the Monastery of Los Jerónimos, an 18th-century edifice originally built for the Hieronymite order of monks. The monastery forms the main administration building, which thus resembles a cloister in structure: four hallways forming a rectangle around a central open courtyard. The school's chapel is part of the original structure. Also present are several newly constructed buildings housing classrooms and faculty offices.

Studies offered 

UCAM offers study of undergraduate degrees and graduate degrees (includes Master's programs and Ph.D. programs) in areas of:

 Architecture
 Arts and Humanities
 Business and Legal Studies
 Communications and Social Studies
 Engineering
 Health
 Nursing
 Sports

Schools of University 
School of Business and Legal Studies
School of Engineering
School of Health Sciences and Physical Education
School of Social Sciences and Communications

Relationship with the professional world 
The university maintains connections with over 200 other universities worldwide. Preparation for working life is part of the education program at UCAM, which also has an established network of business contacts to help ensure employment for its alumni after graduation.

UCAM and the "New Evangelization" of Pope John Paul II 
Throughout his pontificate Pope John Paul II made reference to the need for a "new evangelization," a method by which the modern world could be effectively engaged with and evangelized to by the Catholic Church. The principles of this new evangelization are laid out most fully in the apostolic letter Novo Millennio Ineunte ("At the Beginning of the New Millennium"), promulgated at the close of the year 2000.

UCAM's stance toward the secular world is informed by this notion, as can be seen in the Letter from the President introducing English-speaking foreign students to UCAM. According to Mendoza, the university has

a vocation both to teach and evangelise in the academic, scientific and cultural world and provide an instrument in Faith to solve the many questions and problems of contemporary society and in this way contribute to social, cultural and human development and progress.

Fundamentally, then, UCAM is supposed to be a Christian institution in dialogue with the modern world for the purposes of evangelization and the improvement of human society as a whole.

Controversies 

In 2006 and 2012 there were some complaints from the group of lawyers and engineers in the Region of Murcia over some titles offered in this university.

References

External links 

Catholic universities and colleges in Spain
Education in the Region of Murcia
Educational institutions established in 1983
1983 establishments in Spain
Universities and colleges in Spain